The Northwest Industrial Exposition was held in Spokane, Washington (then known as Spokane Falls) in October 1890. It followed the August 4, 1889 fire that burned much of downtown. Chauncey B. Seaton designed the exposition hall. Artworks displayed included works by Frederic Remington. The wooden exposition building burned in September 11, 1893.

History
Washington became a state November and 11, 1889. The exposition hall was built at Sprague Avenue and Riverside Avenue. The exposition touted conquering nature. Light installations featured at the exposition.

People profiled in the exposition brochure include F. Lewis Clark, Horace L. Cutter, Kirtland K. Cutter, laywer and writer Chester Glass, businessman and state legislator B. C. Van Houten, D. M. Drumheller, David B. Jenkins, and Dr. C. S. Penfield.

See also
Lewis and Clark Centennial Exposition, held in Portland, Oregon in 1905
List of world's fairs

References

1890 in Washington (state)
1890 festivals